Enric Llansana Beuse (born 12 April 2001) is a footballer who plays as a midfielder for Eredivisie club Go Ahead Eagles. Born in Spain, Llansana represents the Netherlands at youth international level.

Club career 
On 22 June 2022, Llansana signed a 4 year deal with Go Ahead Eagles.

Career statistics

Club

Notes

References

External links
 Career stats & Profile - Voetbal International

2001 births
Living people
Sportspeople from Tarragona
Dutch footballers
Netherlands youth international footballers
Spanish footballers
Dutch people of Spanish descent
Spanish emigrants to the Netherlands
Association football midfielders
AFC Ajax players
Jong Ajax players
Go Ahead Eagles players
Eerste Divisie players